Prepona laertes, the shaded-blue leafwing or Laertes prepona, is a butterfly of the family Nymphalidae. It is found in large parts of Central and South America.

The wingspan is about 88 mm. It is a very variable species and a great number of subspecies and forms have been described. Most of these are now considered synonyms.

The larvae feed on Inga vera, Inga ruiziana and Andira inermis.

Subspecies
Prepona laertes laertes (Paraguay)
Prepona laertes demodice (Godard, [1824]) (French Guiana, Brazil, Surinam, Bolivia, Costa Rica, Colombia, Peru, Ecuador, Bolivia)
Prepona laertes louisa Butler, 1870 (Colombia, Venezuela, Trinidad)
Prepona laertes octavia Fruhstorfer, 1905 (Honduras, Colombia, Guatemala, Mexico, Panama, Ecuador)

Gallery

References

Charaxinae
Butterflies described in 1811
Fauna of Brazil
Nymphalidae of South America
Butterflies of Central America
Taxa named by Jacob Hübner